What's Goin' On Ai (stylized as What's goin' on A.I.)  is the fifth studio album by Japanese-American singer-songwriter Ai, released on September 27, 2006, by Island Records and Universal Sigma. It was released after the successful ballad single "Believe," and the upbeat R&B song "I Wanna Know."

Background and development 

After Ai's 2005 ballad "Story," Ai reached national fame, receiving a three million ringtone certification and performing the song at the 56th NHK Kōhaku Uta Gassen New Years music competition. Her first single after Mic-a-holic Ai was a ballad in a similar vein to "Story," called "Believe." The song was used as the drama ''Team Medical Dragons theme song, her first song to be used as a drama theme song. The single debuted at number two, her highest position to date.

A month before the album's release date, Ai released a second single before from the album, the R&B dance song "I Wanna Know." It was used in a TV commercial for Pepsi Nex.

 Writing and production 

What's Goin On Ai features a much wider variety of producers than Ai's previous albums. Previous album collaborators include T. Kura ("Music," "Love Is..."), who has worked with Ai since 2004, as well as DJ Yutaka ("Believe," "No Way") and Icedown ("Mirai"), who both worked on Mic-a-holic Ai (2005). Ai worked with DJ Watarai on the single "I Wanna Know," who had previously collaborated with her in 2004, on his song "Welcome 2 da Party," which featured both Ai and rapper Hi-D.

Ai collaborated with four international singers on the album: American singer Trey Songz, Jamaican rapper Shaggy, South Korean R&B singer, actor and idol Rain, and Turkish pop singer Yalın. Several songs were produced by overseas musicians. The Martin Kierszenbaum-produced "Famous" heavily samples Yalın's 2004 song "Değmez." "Ooh" was produced by American production team The Insomniax, and "Go Find Your Way" was produced by New York City brothers John "Papa Jube" Altino and Arden Altino. The original version on "Beautiful" was arranged by American D/R Period, and remixed by New York remixer Coptic. "Too Much" was originally produced by South Korean music mogul JYP, and was remixed by The Orange Factory.

The album's title was inspired by song "I Wanna Know," which Ai wrote about global affairs. "Believe" was inspired by reading the manga for Team Medical Dragon. After reading the manga, Ai felt that every person should be treasured, which inspired the lyrics to the song.

The interludes of the album feature Ai's mother, father, grandmother and her friends.

The majority of songs were recorded at Prime Sound Studio Form in Meguro, Tokyo, with additional Tokyo recording at Real & Beats Studio, TamStar Studio, Sony Studio Tokyo and Bunkamura Studio. Ai recorded three songs in New York's Dojo Studios and Very Cherry Studios: "We Gonna," "Beautiful" and "Famous."

 Promotion and concerts

The pop ballad "Believe" received the greatest promotion on the album, being used as the primetime TV drama Team Medical Dragon'''s theme song. "Believe" was also used in music.jp commercials.

"I Wanna Know" was used in a high profile Pepsi Nex commercial, as well as commercials for digital music providers Dwango and M-Up. Two other songs were used in TV commercial campaigns, "No Way!" in Lotte's Xylitol gum commercials, and the original version of "Beautiful" featured in beauty care center La Parler's commercials. "Mirai" was used as the ending theme song for TV Tokyo's golfing show featuring female professional golfer Ai Miyazato, Miyazato Ai no Big Golf in USA.

Ai performed "I Wanna Know" at the late night music show Bokura no Ongaku on September 1, 2006, as well as two other non-album songs. On September 27, 2006, Ai performed a secret live to 2,000 people at a free event at Bunkamura in Shibuya, Tokyo.

Ai followed the album with her What's Goin' On Ai Japan Tour, initially featuring 11 dates across the country in November and December 2006. An extra date was added on December 13, where Ai performed at the Nippon Budokan stadium in Tokyo to 12,000 people. The album was released as a live album in 2007, Live Ai, as well as being released to DVD on the same day, titled Nippon Budokan Ai.

 Critical reception 

Critics thought highly of the album. What's In? reiviewers called the album a "must item," noting the album's "rhythm, groove and overflowing cool." Yosuke Motoi of Hot Express enjoyed the contrast between the album's issue-pressing title and the songs' lyrics, which instead of being confronting, are introspectively asking what (the songs' protagonists) should be doing. Morio Mori of Listen Japan felt that the album was "scaled up" compared to her previous works, being impressed with the album's breath. Ai's vocals were praised by many reviewers, with CDJournal calling the vocals on "Love Is..." were "surely a thing to give you goosebumps."

Ai won two awards for the videos on the album. "I Wanna Know" won the Best Female Video award at the 2007 Space Shower Music Video Awards, and "Believe" won Best R&B Video at the 2007 MTV Video Music Awards Japan.

 Chart performance 

The album debuted at number two in Japan, losing to folk band Kobukuro's first greatest hits album All Singles Best. In its first week, it sold 101,000 copies, which is currently Ai's best first week total to date. Like many of her releases, What's Goin On Ai was a long-term seller, charting in the top 10 for four weeks, and spending a total of 17 weeks in the top 300. The album was certified platinum in its month of release.

In Taiwan, the album charted for five weeks in the Japanese/Korean subchart, peaking at number 11. This was her best position in Taiwan to date, however it did not reach the combined chart's top 20.

 Track listing 

Personnel

Personnel details were sourced from What's Goin' On Ais liner notes booklet.

Managerial

Yuki Arai – co-executive producer
Naoshi Fujikura – head publicity and promotion
Nobuhiko Kakihara – promotion planning
Justin Kalifowitz – production coordination (#6, #10-#12)
Aiichiro Kiyohara – A&R director
Kaz Koike – co-executive producer
Shinki Miura – co-executive producer

Hitomi Miyamoto – artwork coordination
Keiko Ohashi – Altino Music production management (#5)
Koichi Sakakibara – artist management
Sakie Sekiya – production coordination (#12)
Ellie Shibata – production coordination (#12)
Yuko Yasumoto – production coordination (#6, #10-#12)

Performance credits

Ai – vocals, background vocals
Robbie Danzie – introduction monologue (#1)
Icedown – all instruments (#14)
The Insomniax – all instruments (#10)
Shigeki Ippon – viola (#4)
Hiroki Kashiwagi – cello (#4)
Kazunori Kumagai – tap (#4)
Shoko Miki – viola (#4)

Koichiro Muroya – violin (#4)
Naoto – violin (#4)
Yuichi Ohno – additional keyboards (#6)
Rain – vocals (#12)
Shaggy – vocals (#13)
Trey Songz – vocals (#11)
Yalın – vocals (#13)

Visuals and imagery

Noriko Goto – stylist
Akihisa Inoue – design
Nicci Keller – photographer

Misato Kumamoto – art direction, design
Maki Morita – live stage "paparazzi" photographer
Akemi Ono – hair, make-up

Technical and production

Filthy Rich Ahee – recording (#6, #11)
John "Papa Jube" Altino – arrangement, production (#5)
Arden Altino – arrangement, production (#5)
C-murder – pre-production recording (#8-#9)
Coptic – remixing (#11)
Tom Coyne – mastering
Digga – additional remix production (#12)
DJ Watarai – arrangement, production (#4)
DJ Yutaka – arrangement, production (#8-#9)
D.O.I – mixing (#4-6, #8-#12, #14)
D/R Period – production (#6), original version arrangement (#11), original version production (#11)
Icedown – production (#14)
The Insomniax – arrangement, production (#10)
Jin – arrangement, production, strings arrangement (#4)

JYP – original version arrangement, original version production (#12)
Hiroki Kashiwagi – head strings arrangement (#4)
Futoshi Kawashima – strings arrangement (#4)
Martin Kierszenbaum – arrangement, production (#13)
T. Kura – arrangement, mixing, production (#1-#2, #15)
Kwon Tae Eun – original version arrangement, original version production (#12)
OQD – recording (#1-#6, #8-#10, #12, #14-#15)
The Orange Factory – remixing (#12)
Dave "Hard-Drive" Pensato – mixing (#13)
Shingo S. – keyboard arrangement (#8)
Kaori Sawada – keyboard arrangement (#9)
Brian Stanley – mixing (#12)
Tony Ugval – recording (#13)

Charts

Sales and certifications

Release history

References 

2006 albums
Ai (singer) albums
Japanese-language albums
Universal Music Group albums
Island Records albums
Universal Sigma albums